NCEP may refer to:

 National Cholesterol Education Program
 National Centers for Environmental Prediction